Ronnie Lang (sometimes spelled Ronny; born July 24, 1929) is an American jazz alto saxophonist.  His professional début was with Hoagy Carmichael's Teenagers.  He also played with Earle Spencer (1946), Ike Carpenter, and Skinnay Ennis (1947). Lang gained attention during his two tenures with Les Brown's Orchestra (1949–50 and 1953–56).  He recorded with the Dave Pell Octet in the mid-1950s.  During this time he attended Los Angeles State College of Applied Arts and Sciences studying music and woodwinds.  In 1958 he became a prolific studio musician in Los Angeles, often employed by Henry Mancini, and he played the iconic sax melodic line in Bernard Herrmann's score for the movie Taxi Driver (1976). Lang also recorded with Pete Rugolo (1956), Bob Thiele (1975), and Peggy Lee (1975).

Partial discography
With Sammy Davis Jr
It's All Over but the Swingin' (Decca, 1957)
With Ted Nash
Peter Gunn (Crown, 1959)
With Pete Rugolo
Music for Hi-Fi Bugs (EmArcy, 1956)
Out on a Limb (EmArcy, 1956)
The Original Music of Thriller (Time, 1961)
With  His All Stars
Modern Jazz  (Tops,  1958)

Television soundtracks
With the Vince Guaraldi Sextet
It's the Great Pumpkin, Charlie Brown (1966)
You're in Love, Charlie Brown (1967)

Notes

References
 
 
 
 

1929 births
Living people
American jazz alto saxophonists
American male saxophonists
Musicians from Los Angeles
21st-century American saxophonists
Jazz musicians from California
21st-century American male musicians
American male jazz musicians
Earle Spencer Orchestra members
Los Angeles State College alumni